Dermomurex raywalkeri is a species of sea snail, a marine gastropod mollusk in the family Muricidae, the murex snails or rock snails.

Description
The length of the shell varies between 8 mm and 10 mm.

Distribution
This marine species occurs off Western Australia.

References

 Wilson, B., 1994. Australian Marine Shells. Prosobranch Gastropods. Vol. 2. 1 ed. Odyssey Publishing, Kallaroo, WA. 1–370.
 Merle D., Garrigues B. & Pointier J.-P. (2011) Fossil and Recent Muricidae of the world. Part Muricinae. Hackenheim: Conchbooks. 648 pp. page(s): 214

Gastropods described in 1986
Dermomurex